Hog Island is the second largest island in Berkeley Sound, Falkland Islands.

During the August 1833 events in nearby Port Louis, the surviving members of Luis Vernet's colony sought refuge on the nearby Hog Island to escape the murderous gang of Antonio Rivero, and they regularly sent their boat to neighbouring Long Island for food supplies to bring cattle, pigs, and geese.

References

East Falkland
Islands of the Falkland Islands